Wetaskiwin was a federal electoral district in Alberta, Canada, that was represented in the House of Commons of Canada from 1925 to 2015.

Geography
In its final configuration, the riding was located south of Edmonton and was legally described as commencing at the intersection of the westerly limit of the Town of Devon with the right bank of the North Saskatchewan River; thence generally southeasterly along the westerly limit of said town to the southwesterly corner of said town (at Highway 60); thence southerly along said highway to Township Road 494; thence easterly along said road to the westerly limit of the City of Leduc; thence easterly, southerly, easterly, northerly and easterly along the southerly limit of said city to Highway No. 623; thence easterly along said highway to the easterly limit of Leduc County; thence generally southwesterly along said limit to the northerly limit of the County of Wetaskiwin No. 10; thence easterly and generally southerly along the northerly and easterly limits of said county to the easterly limit of Ponoka County; thence generally southerly along said limit to the northerly limit of Lacombe County; thence generally southeasterly, generally southerly and generally westerly along the northerly, easterly and southerly limits of said county to the east boundary of R 4 W 5; thence south along the east boundary of R 4 W 5 to the south boundary of Tp 38; thence west along the south boundary of Tp 38 to the west boundary of R 8 W 5; thence north along the west boundary of R 8 W 5 to the north boundary of Tp 41; thence east along the north boundary of Tp 41 to the right bank of the North Saskatchewan River; thence generally northerly and generally easterly along said bank to the point of commencement.

This federal electoral riding represents the County of Wetaskiwin No. 10, Ponoka County, Lacombe County, Leduc County, part of Clearwater County and the cities of Wetaskiwin and Lacombe.

History
This riding was created in 1924 from Strathcona and Victoria ridings.

Like most federal ridings in Alberta, it at first elected an UFA MP, former Calgary labour reformer William Irvine, in 1926 and 1930.

Then from 1935 to 1945 it elected Norman Jaques of the radical monetary reform party Social Credit.

Like most other ridings in rural Alberta, it veered sharply to the right after World War II; it was represented by a centre-right MP without interruption from 1935 onward–Social Credit from 1935 to 1958, the Progressive Conservatives from 1958 to 1993, Reform from 1993 to 2000, the Canadian Alliance from 2000 to 2003, and the Conservatives after 2003.  Individual centre or left-wing candidates were usually lucky to approach 20 percent of the vote; the last time a single candidate from a non-right wing party cleared that hurdle was 1968.

That aside, in this riding in every election from 1925 to 1957 (excepting 1935) and in 1962, the successful candidate did not win a majority of the riding's votes. More votes went to the unsuccessful candidates than went to the successful one.

In 2003, a portion of Red Deer riding was transferred to this electoral district.

The riding was abolished ahead of the 2015 election.  The bulk of the riding, including Lacombe, was merged with the northern portion of Red Deer to form Red Deer-Lacombe.  Much of the northern portion, including the city of Wetaskiwin, was merged with Edmonton—Mill Woods—Beaumont to form Edmonton-Wetaskiwin.  Smaller portions were transferred to Yellowhead and Battle River-Crowfoot.

Members of Parliament

Current Member of Parliament
Its Member of Parliament is Blaine Calkins, a member of the Conservative Party of Canada.

Candidates for the 2006 election

In the spring of 2005, Dale Johnston announced that he would not be a candidate in the next federal election. A nomination meeting held in May 2005 selected Blaine Calkins as the Conservative Party candidate. Calkins was born and raised in the Lacombe area. He is a graduate of the University of Alberta, and a tenured faculty member at Red Deer College. He began his career in politics as a member of the Lacombe Town Council, and as such has been involved with the Board of Directors of the Lacombe Municipal Ambulance Society, The Board of Directors for Family and Community Support Services, The Municipal Planning Commission, David Thompson Tourist Council and the Disaster Services Committee. Calkins has been involved in the Reform/Canadian Alliance/Conservative Party since becoming a member in 1996. He served on the Candidate Nomination Committee for the Canadian Alliance Wetaskiwin Riding in 1999, and joined the Board of Directors in 2000. Since then, he has held various Board positions, including President, Vice President and Director of Communications.

Peter Crossley was the Liberal Party candidate for the 2006 election.  Mr Crossley is a graduate from the University of Alberta and has an honours law degree from the University of Wales at Cardiff.  He has operated his own law practice in Rocky Mountain House for the past 12 years, and has served on the Red Deer Kidney Foundation, the Rocky Kinsmen, and the Rotary Club.

Jim Graves was the candidate for the New Democratic Party in the 2006 election .  Graves has 27 years of experience as a Professional Engineer, and has been a farmer-rancher since 1989.

Tom Lampman was the Green Party's candidate for Wetaskiwin in the 2006 election .  Lampman was the only candidate who also ran in the 2004 federal election, where he outperformed his party's nationwide results by capturing 6.2% of the vote.  Like the other candidates, he has experience with the farming industry, as he runs an agricultural consulting business specializing in dairy.  One of his specific environmental concerns is thermal pollution from electric power generation.  Lampman resides outside of Calmar.

Election results

See also
 Wetaskiwin Alberta provincial electoral district
 Wetaskiwin Northwest Territories territorial electoral district
 List of Canadian federal electoral districts
 Past Canadian electoral districts

References
 
 Atlas of Canada
 
 Expenditures - 2008
 Expenditures - 2004
 Expenditures - 2000
 Expenditures - 1997
 Elections Canada
 Website of the Parliament of Canada

Notes

Former federal electoral districts of Alberta
Lacombe, Alberta
Ponoka, Alberta
Wetaskiwin